The 24th Guldbagge Awards ceremony, presented by the Swedish Film Institute, honored the best Swedish films of 1988, and took place on 6 March 1989. Katinka and Back to Ararat were presented with the award for Best Film.

Awards
 Best Film: 
 Katinka by Max von Sydow
 Back to Ararat by Jim Downing, Per-Åke Holmquist, Suzanne Khardalian and Göran Gunér
 Best Director: Max von Sydow for Katinka
 Best Actor: Tomas Bolme for Creditors
 Best Actress: Lena T. Hansson for Lethal Film
 Best Screenplay: Bengt Danneborn and Lennart Persson for Det är långt till New York
 Best Cinematography: Peter Mokrosinski for Friends
 Creative Achievement:
 Jan Troell
 Michal Leszczylowski
 Lisbet Gabrielsson
 The Ingmar Bergman Award: Lars-Owe Carlberg

References

External links
Official website
Guldbaggen on Facebook
Guldbaggen on Twitter
24th Guldbagge Awards at Internet Movie Database

1989 in Sweden
1988 film awards
Guldbagge Awards ceremonies
March 1989 events in Europe
1980s in Stockholm